The Union of Centrists is a centrist, liberal political party in Greece. The leader and founder of the party is the veteran anti-corruption activist Vassilis Leventis. It strongly supports Greece's remaining an integral part of the European Union.

History 
The party was founded by Vassilis Leventis in 1992 under the title "Union of Centrists and Ecologists". The name was changed shortly after. The Union of Centrists claims to be the ideological continuation of the old party Centre Union. Previously Vassilis Leventis was a part of the PASOK party when it was launched, but Vassilis Leventis left and started the Union of Centrists because of disagreements.

The party strives to become "the political continuance of the centrist expression in Greece". Leventis aimed to become part of the Venizelist legacy of some Greek politicians of the past, such as Eleftherios Venizelos and George Papandreou (senior).

Positions 

1. To reduce the salary of all elected representatives by 50%, the President of the Republic, the Prime Minister, ministers, deputies, mayors, regional governors, as well as drastically reduce expenses for consultants, retired, detached and collaborators of all above.

2. For the abolition of the pension for current and past members, ministers, presidents of the Republic, Prime Ministers and those who have occupied all kinds of offices in the grades of local government.
 
3. For the purpose of identifying by means of a special plan, retrospectively, 10 years of all public sector debt, DEKOs and municipalities and regions, and their transfer to the private sector, in order to reduce public spending and to reward the conscientious civil servants.
 
4. For the introduction of income criteria for all benefits, tax exemptions and pensions for all citizens, that with the money saved by having and holding to support vulnerable groups of citizens (disabled, unemployed, single-parent families, students, large families, farmers, soldiers ).
 
5. To define the number of members in parliament to 200 as permitted by the Constitution and later to 150 (when the Constitution is amended).
 
6. For a method of recruiting staff in the public sector with absolutely invisible points other than their merit-based experience which is applicable for the position and to abolish individuals who gained positions through cronyism. The measure may also apply to the private sector in order for legal persons to enter beneficial European programs and to receive bank facilities.
 
7. To establish the Simple Analogue (without bonus) for both the parliamentary and local elections and the enshrinement of the measure as a constitutional article.
 
8. For the measure to include employees in the profits of large enterprises (over 200 employees) up to 40% of their total, particularly in automated industries.
 
9. For the pluralistic operation of all SMEs (televisions, radios, newspapers) and the imposition of strict sanctions in the case of organized propaganda.
 
10. For the approval by the Parliament of all loans, bonds, government securities issued and the referral to the Prime Minister's Justice, which exceeds the deficit rate set by the European Union in the management of finances.
 
11. The annulment of the Prespa agreement and holding of a referendum on it in Greece.

12. We also call for the trial of those who have defrauded the system from a state to a local level, ranging from political actions that led to crisis, to fake public sector employment, fake private contracts and the abolishment of employment through private sector contracts done through public sector workers right before elections.

Electoral support

Until 2015, the party's influence was marginal, with 1.79% of the total vote in the January 2015 Greek legislative election and no MPs being its highest achievement. In the September 2015 Greek legislative election the party cleared the 3% hurdle for representation in the Greek Parliament with 9 MPs after it won 186,457 votes (3.43%). 2 MPs left the parliamentary group: Georgios Dimitrios Karras in November 2016 and Theodora Megaloeconomou in July 2017, the latter becoming a Syriza MP in January 2018. The party has currently 5 MPs.

In the 2019 election the party did not reach the 3% threshold and thus lost representation in the Hellenic Parliament.

Election results

Hellenic Parliament

European Parliament

References

External links
 

Centrist parties in Greece
European Democratic Party
Liberal parties in Greece
Political parties established in 1992
Pro-European political parties in Greece
1992 establishments in Greece